Amarsinh is an Indian male given name. Notable people with the name include:

Amarsinh Chaudhary (1941–2004), Indian politician
Tushar Amarsinh Chaudhary (born 1965), Indian politician, son of Amarsinh
Amarsinh Pandit (born 1964), Indian politician

Indian masculine given names